KZ 2 or variant, may refer to:

 Killzone 2, PlayStation 3 videogame
 KZ2, a kart racing class
 SAI KZ II, a Danish airplane

See also
 KZ (disambiguation)